</ref> She also acted and directed several stage plays on gender and sexuality issues in Tamil and Kannada. The Truth about Me: A Hijra Life Story by A. Revathi is part of the syllabus for final year students of The American College in Madurai. The American College is the first college in India to introduce third gender literature and studies with research-oriented seminars. Naan Saravanan's Alla (2007) and Vidya's I Am Vidya (2008) were among early transwoman autobiographies. Kalki Subramaniam's  Kuri Aruthean ("Phallus, I cut") is a collection of Tamil poems about transgender lives.

The American College in Madurai also introduced Maraikappatta Pakkangal ("Hidden Pages") as a course book for "Genderqueer and Intersex Human Rights studies" as part of the curriculum for Tamil and English department students in 2018. It is the first book on the LGBT community in the Tamil language, launched by Gopi Shankar Madurai and state BJP leader Vanathi Srinivasan in 2014.

In January 2018, Vidupattavai (விடுபட்டவை) was released at the 41st Chennai Book Fair. The book chronicles the life of a gay man in Chennai in the form of short stories, essays, poems and critiques. The book was co-published by Queer Chennai Chronicles and Karuppu Pradhigal. It was released by Tamil writer and actor Shobasakthi.

Notable Tamil LGBT people

 C. Devi – first transgender woman in Tamil Nadu to contest in the Assembly elections
 K. Gunavathi – first transgender nurse in Tamil Nadu
 Karpaga – transgender actor
 Maya Jafer – transgender activist and doctor
 Narthaki Nataraj – first transgender woman to receive the Sangeet Natak Akademi Award and the first transgender person to be awarded Padma Shri India's fourth-highest civilian award
 Padmini Prakash – first transgender news reader
 A. Revathi – transgender writer and activist
 Malini Jeevarathnam - An award-winning queer filmmaker, producer, actor, show host and activist.
 Gopi Shankar Madurai – youngest candidate in the 2016 Tamil Nadu Legislative Assembly election and also the first openly intersex and genderqueer person to run for public office
 Living Smile Vidya – Tamil writer, artist and actor
 Kalki Subramaniam – openly transgender entrepreneur and founder of the Sahodari Foundation
 Grace Banu – first transgender person to be admitted to an engineering college in the state of Tamil Nadu
 Esther Bharathi – first transgender pastor
 Dr. Sudha – first transgender person to receive an honorary degree in 2014 
 S. Swapna – first transgender Indian Administrative Service aspirant
 Rose Venkatesan – first transgender woman TV host in Tamil Nadu
 K. Prithika Yashini – first transgender woman sub-inspector of the Tamil Nadu police
 Dr. Meena Kandasamy – Bisexual poet, fiction writer, translator and activist

See also
LGBT rights in India
Tamil Sexual Minorities
Hijra (South Asia)
Third gender

References

Tamil Nadu
Tamil Nadu
Tamil Nadu